Casey Range is a jagged, razor-backed ridge and a few nunataks in a line extending north–south, standing 8 miles west of David Range, in the Framnes Mountains. Discovered by the British Australian and New Zealand Antarctic Research Expedition (BANZARE), 1929–31, under Douglas Mawson, who named it for Rt. Hon. Richard G. Casey.

Further reading 
 United States. Defense Mapping Agency. Hydrographic Center, Sailing Directions for Antarctica: Includes Islands South of Latitude 60.̊, P 293

External links 

 Casey Range on USGS website
 Casey Range on AADC website
 Casey Range on SCAR website
 Casey Range Sunset, Sunrise and Moon data
 Casey Range lunar phases data

References 

Mountain ranges of Mac. Robertson Land
Ridges of Mac. Robertson Land